Carl Johann Wilhelm Neumann (born 5 October 1849 in Grevesmühlen – died 6 March 1919 in Riga) was a Baltic German architect and art historian.

Neumann's family moved to Kreutzburg (then in Russian Empire) during Wilhelm's childhood. When he was 15 years old, he worked as an apprentice at Paul Max Bertschy's engineering office during the construction of the Riga–Dünaburg Railway. After this he studied at the Riga Polytechnicum, and beginning 1875 at the Imperial Academy of Arts in Saint Petersburg.

Beginning 1873 Neumann worked as an architect in Dünaburg (Daugavpils), and 1878 he was promoted to be chief architect of Dünaburg. In 1887 he began to publish art historical publications. In 1895 he moved to Riga, where numerous prominent buildings in the style of historicism was created, amongst these the Peitav Synagogue. Furthermore, Neumann was the planner of many manor buildings in the Baltic governorates and public buildings such as Kurland Provincial Museum and Athenaeum.

Between 1899 and 1901 Neumann taught at the polytechnicum. In 1905 he became director of the Riga Art Museum, a building that was designed by himself. After 1906 Neumann focused on his art historical works.

Neumann died on 6 March 1919, 69 years old.

Gallery

Literature 
 E. Grosmane. Vilhelms Neimanis Latvijas mākslas vēsturē., Rīga, 1991, 7.-21. lpp.
 Jānis Krastiņš. Rīgas arhitektūras meistari 1850–1940, Jumava, 2002
 Peter Wörster: „Der Vater der baltischen Kunstgeschichte“. Wilhelm Neumann – Architekt, Kunsthistoriker und Denkmalpfleger. In: Jahrbuch des baltischen Deutschtums, Bd. 55 (2008), Lüneburg 2007, S. 83-100.

1849 births
1919 deaths
Baltic-German people
Architects from the Russian Empire
Historians from the Russian Empire
People from Grevesmühlen
Academic staff of Riga Technical University
Latvian art historians
Architects from Riga
German art historians
20th-century Latvian historians
19th-century Latvian historians